John Gregson (1919–1975) was an English actor

John Gregson may also refer to:

John Gregson (politician) (1821–1867), member of the Tasmanian House of Assembly and the Tasmanian Legislative Council 
John Gregson, Baron Gregson (1924–2009),  British politician, member of the Labour Party
John Gregson (sailor) (1924–2016), British George Cross recipient
John Gregson (footballer) (born 1939), English winger who played from the mid 1950s to 1971

See also
John Grigson (1893–1943), British pilot and air commodore